Eupatorium formosanum is a plant species in the family Asteraceae. It is found in Taiwan and the Ryukyu Islands (Japan).

References

formosanum
Flora of the Ryukyu Islands
Flora of Taiwan